is a Japanese football player. She plays for Mynavi Sendai. She played for Japan national team.

Club career
Kitahara was born in Fujieda on December 17, 1988. After graduating from Kanto Gakuen University, she joined Albirex Niigata in 2011. She played 93 games in L.League. In 2016, she moved to Mynavi Vegalta Sendai.

National team career
On September 22, 2013, Kitahara debuted for the Japan national team against Nigeria. In 2014, she played at the 2014 Asian Games and Japan won second place. She was also played in the 2015 World Cup, in which Japan won second place. She played nine games for Japan until 2015.

National team statistics

References

External links

Japan Football Association
 Fox Soccer profile
 Eurosport profile

1988 births
Living people
Kanto Gakuen University alumni
Association football people from Shizuoka Prefecture
Japanese women's footballers
Japan women's international footballers
Nadeshiko League players
Albirex Niigata Ladies players
Mynavi Vegalta Sendai Ladies players
Asian Games medalists in football
Asian Games silver medalists for Japan
Footballers at the 2014 Asian Games
2015 FIFA Women's World Cup players
Women's association football defenders
Medalists at the 2014 Asian Games
Universiade silver medalists for Japan
Universiade medalists in football
People from Fujieda, Shizuoka
Medalists at the 2009 Summer Universiade